Mark G. Frank (born 1961) is a communication professor and department chair, and an internationally recognized expert on human nonverbal communication, emotion, and deception. Dr. Frank conducts research and does training on micro expressions of emotion and of the face. His research studies include other nonverbal indicators of deception throughout the rest of the body. He is the Director of the Communication Science Center research laboratory that is located on the North Campus of the University at Buffalo. Under his guidance, a team of graduate researchers conduct experiments and studies for private and government entities. Frank uses his expertise in communication and psychology to assist law enforcement agencies in monitoring both verbal and nonverbal communication.

Early life and influences 

Mark G. Frank was born in Buffalo, New York. His father was a Buffalo Police officer for 32 years which was a factor that influenced his interests in criminal deception detection. During college, Frank worked as a bouncer at the local bars, where his interest in the field of communication began to evolve. He began to study and learn the behaviors of underage patrons who tried to enter the establishment using fake identification thereby fostering his ability to determine when others were lying. From here, Frank went on to study hours of video footage of criminals. Studying how criminals interacted, he learned to pick up on subtle micro expressions that leak out when people are telling a lie. The experience Mark Frank dealt with as a bouncer increased his passion towards communication aspects with others, as well as developed these basic skills.

In 1983, Frank graduated from the University at Buffalo with a bachelor's degree in psychology. He then earned his Ph.D. in Social Psychology from Cornell University in 1989.

Academic positions 
Mark G. Frank is currently a professor at SUNY University at Buffalo in the Department of Communications and the Director of the Department of Communication Science Center.

After graduating from Cornell, Dr. Frank received a National Research Service Award from the National Institute of Mental Health to do postdoctoral research with dr. Paul Ekman who worked in the Psychiatry Department at the University of California at San Francisco Medical School. The two worked on a project called "A Few Can Catch A Liar", which provided the first evidence that some psychologists can achieve high accuracy in catching lies.

Frank joined the School of Psychology at the University of New South Wales in  Australia in 1992 and four years later, he accepted a teaching position at Rutgers University.

Consulting and training 
Dr. Frank has trained over 1,000 law enforcement agencies in the United States and overseas law enforcement agencies. His training focuses on the role that emotion plays in predicting violence,. Dr. Frank has also spent time giving workshops to US and foreign judges and magistrates, such as federal Judiciary, U.S. District Court, Pennsylvania State Trial Judges, New Jersey Judicial College, the New South Wales magistrates, District Court in Australia, and the Belgian Magistrates. He also presented briefings to the National Academy of Sciences and the US congress on Deception and Counter-Terrorism. Overseas, Frank has used his findings to discuss, consult with, or train law enforcement agencies, such as the Metropolitan Police Service in London (Scotland Yard), the Nottinghamshire and Kent Constabularies, the National Crime Faculty, Australian Customs, Australian Federal Police, as well as Dutch, Belgian, and Singaporean authorities. In addition, Frank teaches federal agents, interrogators, and other law enforcement officials to accurately interpret the microexpressions on a person's face; Frank calls these microexpressions "hot spots", which are the facial or emotional cues that indicate deception. Frank has said he can only distinguish between people's truth and lies around 70 percent of the time, so he uses the microexpressions more as an indicator where there is an emotion trying to be concealed.

Currently, Dr. Frank is working with the Transportation Security Administration and other experts in sensor technology. Frank is also working on behavioral screening and Biometrics to make advancements and adjust their behavioral screening program. For the past two decades, Dr. Frank has been studying the faces people use when lying in high-stake situations. He supervised and co-wrote the study with Hurley, that examined whether subjects could suppress facial actions like eyebrow movements or smiles on command while under scrutiny of a lie catcher. 
 These new findings should greatly improve traveler's safety in airports. Forty major airports are going to use his findings for their security processing system where agents will now be able to determine a terrorist's intent based on extremely advanced monitoring systems combined with cultural behavioral cues. The technique is not necessarily one hundred percent effective on its own, but its reliability is increased when it is added onto other forms of security. Using this layering technique greatly increases the change of a terror suspect being caught while going through security  This research is being funded by the National Science Foundation and the Department of Homeland Security.

As a founding member of the FBI's Terrorism Research and Analysis Project, Dr. Frank has worked with the Department of Homeland Security to facilitate the safety of our nation. His plan to decrease 'Terrorist' activity within airports across the country involves "Behavioral Observation Techniques" at TSA Security check-points. Suspected 'Terrorists' would be identified and taken for further screening if the system is used correctly. Thus, the amount of terrorist activity would decrease significantly making air travel more secure.

Micro expressions 

Microexpressions can be defined as, "fleeting expressions of emotion, sometimes so fast that they can happen in the blink of an eye, they occur when a person either deliberately or unconsciously conceals a feeling. Microexpressions are grouped into seven universal emotions which are joy, contempt, surprise, anger, fear, disgust, and sadness. Dr. Mark Frank works on identifying deception with the help of micro facial movement.  He has named 44 movements (sometimes involuntary and specific) that are linked to different emotions related to deception.  Some of these include fear, distrust and stress.  Dr. Frank found that these fleeting expressions/movements are surprisingly accurate when it comes to detecting deceit. He says, "Fleeting facial expressions are expressed by minute and unconscious movements of facial muscles like the frontalis, corregator and risorius and these micro-movements, when provoked by underlying emotions, are almost impossible for us to control." The 44 movements named by Dr. Frank have proven their success in helping to identify potentially illegal behavior and his system is now being tested for the possibility of use to identify potential terrorists.Although the Micro Expressions are proved to be efficient in detecting crimes, it still cannot be used as evidence in the court but can only be used to predict and narrow the range of suspects.

Micro expressions can happen in less than one-fifteenth of a second and generally go unnoticed during daily social interaction. Micro expressions betray us when we lie. We can try to cover our feelings with fake smiles, but involuntary face muscles reveal these hidden emotions. The best and most efficient way to evaluate micro expressions is to videotape the interaction, so that you are able to go back and replay the expressions in slow motion. According to Frank's manuscript entitled "Improving the Ability to Recognize Microexpressions of Emotion," there are now ways to be able to pick up on these micro expressions in real time. The FBI National Academy trainees are learning new ways to identify these expressions and have increased their recognition rate to 70%, and in some cases even 90%. It only took mere weeks for these trainees to pick up on this special ability.

Communication Science Center 
In 2005, Dr. Mark Frank helped raise funding to create the Communication Science Center at the University at Buffalo, The State University of New York. The Communication Science Center at UB relies heavily upon its use of quantitative research to gather a better understanding of today's communicative world.  Both nonverbal and verbal behaviors are studied in hopes of providing new insight into the way in which we communicate in different aspects of our daily lives.  Its focus is currently that of deception detection of nonverbal and psychological cues. This Center supports much research within the Communication Department, made up of basic research, policy analysis, system design, and even scholarly exchange. The CSC focuses on the use of quantitative research methods to further understanding of emotions and nonverbal behaviors with a goal to provide the knowledge that enhances the quality of our communication in a variety of areas including legal, marketing, health care, law enforcement communities. The Center is currently conducting research into deception detection using nonverbal and physiological cues.

Research & publications 

Frank has published numerous research papers and articles on facial expressions, emotion, and interpersonal deception with titles including "Facing Facts: Not all lies are created equal" and "Research methods in detecting deception research." Much of this work was funded by The National Science Foundation, Homeland Security, and the Department of Defense.

Dr. Frank coauthored and edited the book Nonverbal Communication: Science and applications (2013) with David Matsumoto and Hyi Sung Wang. The book uses current research on nonverbal communication with chapters written by professional practitioners to provide a text that is useful both in the classroom and in applied settings. It presents a true scientist-practitioner model, blending cutting-edge behavioral science with real-world practical experience. Dr. Frank is currently working on a project with the transportation security administration.  He is working on testing the TSA’s new behavioral screening program that is planned to be put in effect in 40 major airports around the country.

Dr. Frank supervised and co-wrote a study on Executing Facial Control During Deception Situations Original Paper  along with former graduate student Carolyn M. Hurley. Published in early 2011 the study examined if test subjects could conceal facial expressions (i.e. eyebrow movements, smiles) on command while  under scrutiny by a ‘lie catcher’. For one of his studies, Frank brought in 60 individuals, 33 female and 27 male, and asked them to either take or not take movie tickets, and then lie about it. Some of the subjects were asked to suppress and upper or lower facial activity. The results of the experiment came from a frame-by-frame coding of the facial expression, where Frank found that subjects could reduce the facial activity, but never eliminate it.
The study concluded that liars can reduce their facial actions when under scrutiny, however, they cannot suppress all of them. Frank claims, “As a security strategy, there is great significance in observing and interpreting nonverbal behavior during an investigative interview, especially when the interviewee is trying to suppress certain expressions.” 

Dr. Frank co-researched a study with Gilovich, called "The Dark Side of Self- and Social Perception: Black Uniforms and Aggression in Professional Sports". Their goal was to test if black uniforms were portrayed as evil or aggressive. They designed four studies that investigated what wearing black uniforms in athletics did to perceive and actual aggressiveness of the participants involved.Frank and Gilovich found 25 subjects who knew nothing of the NFL, or NHL and nothing about the corresponding sport. What they found was that teams with black uniforms were consistently rated as being more aggressive than their counterparts. Again, the interesting thing about this is that the subjects knew nothing of what these jersey’s represented, only what it looked like. Frank and Gilovich went to the NFL and NHL and requested official penalty records for all teams from 1970 through the NHL and the NFL. If a team had more penalty time, it was viewed as being more aggressive. As they expected, the top 5 most penalized teams in the NFL over the duration of the data set were also the 5 teams that had black uniforms.  The same held true with the NHL teams in terms of penalty minutes with the exception of one team that came in 4th. They have found two things. First of all, people seem to think that individuals dressed in black are inherently more aggressive (study 1). Second, they discovered that in two professional sports, teams wearing black uniforms are in fact the most aggressive teams in their respective sports (study 2). The results showed that black jerseys tended to get penalties called on them more than white jerseys. In other words, when the subjects knew that the team was wearing black, they felt they made more penalties, regardless of what side of the ball they were on. But when the color of the dark jersey was unclear, there was no bias in how they called the play. The results showed that black uniforms and aggressiveness were positively correlated.

Dr. Frank, along with Daejoong Kim and Sung Tae Kim, conducted a study exploring the changes of emotional-display behavior on different forms of Computer-mediated communication (CMC). The context of the CMC was that of a one-to-one online chat with four different chat conditions – joint-view, no-view, view-in, and view-out. These conditions manipulated visibility and monitor-ability. The results of this study found that the degree of social presence is not influenced by visibility and monitor-ability, although visibility influences the use rate of textual paralinguistic cues.  Emotional-display behavior was found to be only partially influenced by monitor-ability.

Dr. Frank explains what he deals with and wants to accomplish in a research of his saying ""A terrorist act is a profoundly human act, and my research examines people’s behaviors in security settings, including counter-terrorism, intelligence gathering, law enforcement and the legal system. Our work looks at what clues are associated with deception and malfeasance intentions, as well as how good are people at spotting such clues, whether we can train people to spot them better, what sort of interpersonal styles optimize intelligence gathering in interviews, and whether we can create automated systems that might facilitate the identification of individuals who intend to commit an extreme event, or catching the perpetrators of such an act."" 
Dr. Frank has published work in "Nature" a weekly science journal. Frank, along with Nancy Etcoff, Paul Ekman, and John Magee worked on an article titled "Lie Detection and Language Comprehension" under the "Brief Communications" section of the journal. The general idea of the article is that "people who don't understand words are better at picking up lies about emotions". Frank concluded that even people who know how to detect lies and can pick on non-verbal cues are no better off than people who are just guessing. They write that people with no language skills are significantly better at detecting lies than those who can understand the language.

Dr. Frank is a co-developer of an automated computer system that reads facial expressions. In particular, this new technology automates deceit detection through the analysis of eye movements. He used his findings to consult and train virtually with U.S Federal Law Enforcement and Intelligence Agencies.

Dr. Frank has been studying and observing the detection of lies. He held a lecture about "Detecting Deception in an Age of Terrorism." Throughout the lecture he absolved myths about detecting lies, examples such as signs; non-verbal communication. According to Frank, two systems are meshed together when people lie, these systems are cognitive and emotional clues, which are both used to identify the liar.

Paul Ekman served as a consultant in a study carried out by Mark Frank and Carolyn Hurley concerning deception at airport checkpoints. An environment closely resembling these checkpoints was constructed, with people in line waiting to pass. In this environment, people either lied or told the truth about what they intended to do. As the participants were waiting, a police officer walked by and looked at each person. Frank then examined the reactions of these people using behavioral measurement. He found that these behavioral clues separated the liars from the truth tellers.

Dr. Frank also studied the area of social perception. In 1988 he wrote an article along with Thomas Gilovich called "The Dark Side of Self- and Social Perception: Black Uniforms and Aggression in Professional Sports" which was published in the Journal of Personality and Social Psychology. This study showed how people associated the color black with negative attributes. Frank and Gilovich used black uniforms from the NFL and NHL to provide evidence to support their theory. The participants of the study were not familiar with the NFL and NHL or football and hockey in general. The subjects were assessed on different rating scales that tested three levels of aggression. The results showed that black uniforms and aggressiveness were positively correlated.

Frank conducted a study in 2011 with Carolyn M. Hurley called "Executing Facial control During Deception situations." With this study they looked at strategies used by liars to save their face. Research to that date had not shown whether deceivers could suppress elements of their facial expressions. The study looked at smiling versus eyebrow moving on command during deception. He found participants reduced rate of smiling but less for eyebrow moving.

Frank, along with Nancy Etcoff, Paul Ekman, and John Magee worked on an article titled "Lie Detection and Language Comprehension" under the "Brief Communications" section of the journal Nature. The general idea of the article is that "people who don't understand words are better at picking up lies about emotions." Frank concluded that even people who know how to detect lies and can pick on non-verbal cues are no better off than people who are just guessing. They write that people with no language skills are significantly better at detecting lies than those who can understand the language.

The Spectrum independent student newspaper at the University at Buffalo published an article about Mark Frank called “Can’t Lie to Him” due to the fact that he is a professor who conducts deception research by studying facial micro-expressions. He uses multiple forms of technology to detect facial micro-expressions and then uses those technologies to identify different emotions type's people may show.  He uses these micro expressions to detect the common emotions such as fear, anger, disgust and happiness.

Frank's most recent research deals with people’s behaviors in security settings. This includes such things as law enforcement, the legal system and counter-terrorism. The work he contributes to deals with deception clues and how people are good at spotting these clues, and whether or not they can train people to detect the clues as best as they can. Also they try to increase the ability of the automated systems that might assist the recognition of individuals who convey to commit these types of acts.

Media appearances 
In May, 2000 the documentary reality TV show "The Human Zoo" depicted a character founded on Dr. Mark G. Frank. The show was about the delicate dynamics of meeting new people. It, too, explored the effectiveness of first impressions that are made at job interviews, how an attractive appearance affects how successful someone becomes, the limit of personal space, and facial expressions related to deception. Dr. Mark G. Frank's character particularly place the focus on deception and they depict him as a human lie detector. During this show, hidden cameras were set to observe how strangers and acquaintances interacted mutually and interacted. The hostilities and instant friendships were watched by the scholars. While this was a documentary, the main objective was to depict deception within personal, professional, and social settings. In this portion of the show he observes three people being interrogated and determines who has stolen cash from an envelope previous to the interviews. He depends on slow motion technology as well as facial leakage via micro-expressions to see who is lying.

In August 2006, Dr. Mark Frank made a guest appearance on a CBS News segment called "Weeding Out Terrorists" discussing how facial expressions can give away if a person is lying, and also explaining that no behavior always guarantees that someone is lying. Th emotions and behaviors say thinking ahead can help the security officer to decide whether it needs to take a closer look . This showed how Dr. Frank's research can help airport security officials track down potential terrorists boarding planes or any similar scenarios.

State of Mind once interviewed Dr. Mark G. Frank and asked him intriguing questions about detecting lies within people. Dr. Frank revealed that the most surprising research he had found was that deception and hostility actually come together, where as people originally thought they were separate. He also stated that the television show Lie To Me was one of the  most accurate shows out there, with the show being about 80 percent accurate compared to other television shows like Criminal Minds. The show Lie to Me was inspired by Dr. Paul Ekman who Dr. Frank did his post-doctoral research with.  The link below is a recorded session of the interview.(Lie to Me - Interview with Mark Frank)

Another interview featuring Frank, was conducted by NPR (National Public Radio) to show his research on deception and detecting lies. His research was shown through practical use in airport security, law enforcement, the Los Angeles County Sheriff’s Department, and in detecting possible terrorism. In the interview he states that disgust, rather than anger, both of which are cross-cultural micro expressions, drives motivations for terrorists acts.

Dr. Frank has also appeared in over 100 different media sources ranging from print, radio, and television appearances. He has shared knowledge of his work in many places including:

 Today
 ABC Radio National
 The Sydney Morning Herald
 The BBC, National Public Radio
 New Yorker
 The New York Times
 The Philadelphia Inquirer
 48 Hours
 Dateline NBC
 The Learning Channel
 The Discovery Channel
 The National Geographic Channel
 CNN
 Fox News Channel
 The Oprah Winfrey Show

References 

http://www.imdb.com/title/tt0818733/plotsummary?ref_=asrtt_sr_pl
http://www.imdb.com/title/tt0818733/epcast
http://www.ubspectrum.com/features/can-t-lie-to-him-1.3015477#.Ux3kwfldUuc
http://www.stateofmind.it/bibliography/frank-mark-g/

External links 
 Mark Frank Faculty Profile Page  

1961 births
Living people
American social psychologists
University at Buffalo alumni
Cornell University alumni
University at Buffalo faculty